Resurgence! is an album by saxophonist David "Fathead" Newman recorded in 1981 and released on the Muse label.

Reception

In his review for AllMusic, Scott Yanow stated: "David "Fathead" Newman's first freewheeling recording in a number of years showed that he was certainly capable of playing creative soul-jazz and bop when inspired ... An excellent effort".

Track listing 
All compositions by David "Fathead" Newman except where noted
 "Everything Must Change" (Bernard Ighner) – 4:40
 "Mama Lou" – 5:50
 "Davey Blue" – 9:12
 "Carnegie Blues" (Hank Crawford) – 8:25
 "Akua Ewie" (Marcus Belgrave) – 6:22
 "To the Holy Land" (Cedar Walton) – 7:02

Personnel 
David Newman – tenor saxophone, alto saxophone, soprano saxophone, flute
Marcus Belgrave – trumpet, flugelhorn
Ted Dunbar – guitar 
Cedar Walton – piano, electric piano
Buster Williams - bass
Louis Hayes – drums

References 

David "Fathead" Newman albums
1981 albums
Muse Records albums
Albums produced by Michael Cuscuna